Chirikovo is a rural locality (a selo) in Bogolyubovskoye Rural Settlement, Suzdalsky District, Vladimir Oblast, Russia. The population was 34 as of 2010. There are 6 streets.

Geography 
Chirikovo is located 48 km southeast of Suzdal (the district's administrative centre) by road. Dorzhevo is the nearest rural locality.

References 

Rural localities in Suzdalsky District